Corrie Clark (born April 11, 1982) is a female breaststroke and medley swimmer from the United States. At the 2003 Pan American Games, she won silver medals in the 100 breaststroke and 200 IM, although at one point PASO stripped Clark of the breaststroke medal.

Clark studied at and swam for Southern Methodist University (2000-2003).

In 2008, Clark was hired to fill an Associate Coach position at Swarthmore College under the guidance of veteran coach Susan P. Davis.  After a brief stint, Corrie Clark chose to end a 2-year contract early. Corrie began running the swimmer development program at acac Fitness and Wellness Centre in West Chester, PA.  She is currently training full-time at Penn State.

References

1982 births
Living people
American female breaststroke swimmers
People from Chester County, Pennsylvania
SMU Mustangs women's swimmers
Swimmers at the 2003 Pan American Games
Pan American Games silver medalists for the United States
Pan American Games medalists in swimming
Medalists at the 2003 Pan American Games
21st-century American women